Mar Antony Padiyara (11 February 1921 – 23 March 2000) was a Syro Malabar Major Archbishop and cardinal. He was the First Major Archbishop of the Syro-Malabar Catholic Church. He was Major Archbishop of Ernakulam-Angamaly from 1985 to 1996, having previously served as Bishop of Ootacamund (1955–1970) and Archbishop of Changanassery (1970–1985). He was elevated to the cardinalate in 1988.

Biography
Born in Manimala, Travancore, Antony Padiyara studied at St. Peter's Regional Seminary in Bangalore and was ordained to the priesthood on 19 December 1945. He was incardinated into the Latin Rite Diocese of Coimbatore, where he served as curate at Peria Kodiveri and pastor at Kollegal and Ootacamund between 1946 and 1952. He became rector of the minor seminary in 1952 and a professor at St. Peter's Regional Seminary in 1954.

On 3 July 1955, Padiyara was appointed Bishop of Ootacamund by Pope Pius XII. He received his episcopal consecration on the following 16 October from Bishop René-Jean-Baptiste-Germain Feuga, with Bishop Francis Xavier Muthappa and Archbishop Matthew Kavukattu serving as co-consecrators. After attending the Second Vatican Council from 1962 to 1965, Padiyara returned to the Syro-Malabar Rite. On 13 June 1970 he was promoted to Archbishop of Changanassery. He was elected Vice President of the Indian Episcopal Conference (1976), President of the Kerala Catholic Bishops' Council (1983), and President of the Syro-Malabar Bishops Conference (1984). In one of the acts of his short-lived papacy, Pope John Paul I named him Apostolic visitor to the Syro-Malabar Catholics in Kerala on 8 September 1978.

Padiyara was appointed Archbishop of Ernakulam-Angamaly by Pope John Paul II on 23 April 1985. He was created cardinal priest of S. Maria "Regina Pacis" a Monte Verde in the consistory of 28 June 1988. When the Archdiocese of Ernakulam-Angamaly was elevated to the rank of a major archdiocese on 16 December 1992, Padiyara became a Major Archbishop and thus head of the Syro-Malabar Catholic Church. During this period, the powers of Major Archbishop were also vested in the Pontifical Delegate Mar Abraham Kattumana (1992–1995). Within the Roman Curia, he was a member of the Congregation for the Oriental Churches and the Pontifical Commission for the Revision of the Code of Oriental Canon Law. After reaching the mandatory retirement age of 75, he resigned as Major Archbishop on 11 November 1996, after eleven years of service. He was awarded the Padma Shri in 1998.

He later died at the Cardinal Padiyara Nature Cure Centre in Kakkanad, which he himself had founded, aged 79. He is buried in St. Mary's Cathedral Basilica in Ernakulam.

References

External links 
 Antony Padiyara statistics

Indian cardinals
Christian clergy from Kottayam
2000 deaths
1921 births
20th-century Eastern Catholic bishops
Archbishops of Changanassery
Syro-Malabar Catholic Archbishops of Ernakulam-Angamaly
Participants in the Second Vatican Council
Cardinals created by Pope John Paul II
Recipients of the Padma Shri in social work